Chloroclystis bosora is a moth in the family Geometridae. It was described by Herbert Druce in 1888. It is found on Fiji and the New Hebrides.

References

External links

Moths described in 1888
bosora
Moths of Fiji